= End-user (disambiguation) =

An end-user is a person who uses a commercial product or service.

End-user or end user may also refer to:

- User (computing), a person or software using an information system
- Consumer, a person or group using commercial products or services
